Bat Cave Hollow is a valley in eastern Oregon County in the Ozarks of southern Missouri.

Bat Cave Hollow was named for Bat Cave which lies on the south bank of the stream and hosted a bat colony.

References

Valleys of Oregon County, Missouri
Valleys of Missouri